Ptilotodon is an extinct genus of teiid lizard from the Early Cretaceous of Oklahoma. The type and only known species is Ptilotodon wilsoni, named in 2002 on the basis of a single lower jaw with four teeth found in the Antlers Formation. The small size of the specimen may be an indication that it belonged to a juvenile.

References

Early Cretaceous reptiles of North America
Cretaceous lizards
Fossil taxa described in 2002